The 1995 season was the 90th season of competitive football in Norway.

Men's football

League season

Promotion and relegation

Tippeligaen

1. divisjon

Group 1

Group 2

2. divisjon

Norwegian Cup

Final

Replay

Women's football

League season

1. divisjon

Norwegian Women's Cup

Final
Sandviken 3–2 (a.e.t.) Trondheims-Ørn

UEFA competitions

UEFA Champions League

Qualifying round

|}

Group stage

Group B

UEFA Cup Winners' Cup

Qualifying round

|}

First round

|}

UEFA Cup

Preliminary round

|}

First round

|}

National teams

Norway men's national football team

Source:

Results

Norway women's national football team

Results

References

External links
  Norge Menn Senior A, Football Association of Norway 1908–present
 RSSSF.no – National team 1995

 
Seasons in Norwegian football